The Caribbean Link for Guiding is a consortium of 21 Girl Guide Associations from throughout the Caribbean. These include associations from independent countries as well as from British Overseas Territories, coordinated by Girlguiding UK. It was created in 1958.

Members
 Anguilla - Girlguiding Anguilla, a branch association of Girlguiding UK
 Antigua and Barbuda - The Girl Guides Association of Antigua and Barbuda
 Aruba - Het Arubaanse Padvindsters Gilde
 Bahamas - The Bahamas Girl Guides Association
 Barbados - The Girl Guides Association of Barbados
 Belize - The Girl Guides Association of Belize
 Bermuda - Girlguiding Bermuda, a branch association of Girlguiding UK
 British Virgin Islands - The British Virgin Islands Girl Guide Association, a branch association of Girlguiding UK
 Cayman Islands - Girlguiding Cayman Islands, a branch association of Girlguiding UK
 Dominica - The Girl Guides Association of Dominica
 Grenada - The Girl Guides Association of Grenada
 Guyana - Guyana Girl Guides Association
 Jamaica - The Girl Guides Association of Jamaica
 Montserrat - Girlguiding Montserrat,  a branch association of Girlguiding UK
 Netherlands Antilles - Padvindstersvereniging van de Nederlandse Antillen
 Saint Kitts and Nevis - The Girl Guides Association of Saint Christopher and Nevis
 Saint Lucia - Girl Guides Association of Saint Lucia
 Saint Vincent and the Grenadines - Girl Guides Association of Saint Vincent and the Grenadines
 Trinidad and Tobago - The Girl Guides Association of Trinidad and Tobago
 Turks and Caicos - Turks and Caicos Islands branch of Girlguiding UK

History
The Federal Link of the Girl Guides Associations of the West Indies was formed in April 1958 in Trinidad, in the context of the West Indies Federation. Although the West Indies Federation was dissolved, it was decided at a Commissioners conference in 1962 in Dominica to continue the group. The name was changed to the Caribbean Link for Guiding.

Fiftieth anniversary
The Caribbean Link's fiftieth anniversary celebrations culminated on 22 April 2009. An anniversary song was composed by Girl Guide Caryl Edwards of Antigua.

References

Girl Guiding and Girl Scouting